The Patterdale Terrier is a breed of dog descended from the Northern terrier breeds of the early 18th century.

Description

Appearance

There are two breed standards for the Patterdale Terrier belonging to the United Kennel Club (UKC) and the American Dog Breeders Association (ADBA), both in the United States, since the United Kingdom Kennel Club does not recognize the Patterdale Terrier.

The UKC standard states that dogs are between 25 and 38 centimetres tall, and specifies that dogs should be in fit, working condition. The UKC standard further specifies:

Coat and colour

The coat may be one of three types: "smooth," "broken," or "rough."  
 
 Smooth coat: Short, glossy hair. Undercoat still usually present.
 Broken coat: Coarse. May be some longer whiskering on muzzle and chin.
 Rough coat: Longer hair overall, including face, ears, and muzzle. Very thick, protective double coat.

All coat types should have dense and coarse double coats that are harsh to the touch and weatherproof.

Colours include black, red, bronze, black and tan, chocolate, liver, or even liver and tan and occasionally brindle, but never fully white. Any other colours, or larger patches of white away from the chest, are indicative of cross-breeding, particularly with the Jack Russell Terrier. It is traditional for a Patterdale terrier to be of solid colour, with no white markings.

Temperament 
Patterdale Terrier puppies tend to be bold and confident beyond their capabilities. The Patterdale is known as a working terrier, rather than a show dog. Typical of terriers, whose work requires high energy and a strong drive to pursue prey, Patterdales are very energetic and can be difficult to socialize. Though also kept as pets, due to being bred for high-intensity work, they may tend towards being too energetic for a sedentary household life.

History and overview

The origins of the breed can be traced back to the cross breeding of The Old English Terrier (the original black terrier) and the Northumberland Pit Terrier (now extinct) and later to the Lake District, specifically to Ullswater Hunt master Joe Bowman, an early Border Terrier breeder. where he used the best Red Fell terriers and the best local hunting terriers available to him, so that he could continue his efforts to refine the breed even further.

The breed did not gain notability until Cyril Breay, a schoolmaster and huntsman, refined them even further, using the best dogs of northern England. It is believed that all current Patterdale Terriers descend from dogs bred by Breay.

The Patterdale Terrier is more of a "type" rather than a "breed", being the result of a culmination of working terrier breeds indigenous to the United Kingdom. Patterdale Terrier Type dogs were bred by poachers across northern England. As well as others, for the hunting and dispatch of the red fox in the rocky fells around the Lake District, North West and North East of England where a traditional digging dog was not always of great use. Patterdale Terriers have also been used for illegal badger baiting in the UK. 

The Patterdale was developed in the harsh environment in the north of England, an area unsuitable for arable farming and mostly too hilly for cattle. Sheep farming is the predominant farming activity on these hills. Since the fox is perceived by farmers as being predatory with respect to sheep and small farm animals, terriers are used for predator control. Unlike the dirt dens found in the hunt country of the south, the rocky dens found in the north do not allow much digging. As a consequence, the terrier needs to be able to bolt the fox from the rock crevice or dispatch it where it is found.

The use of "hard" dogs to hunt foxes in this way was made illegal in England and Wales by the Hunting Act 2004, as it runs counter to the code of practice under the Act.

The Patterdale made its way to the United States, where it is used for groundhog, raccoon, fox and nutria with great success. Patterdale Terriers, considered highly adaptable, excel worldwide not just at hunting a wide array of quarry, but in a number of canine sports, such as dog agility and terrier racing. In the US, the Patterdale Terrier was recognised by the United Kennel Club on January 1, 1995, but remains unrecognized by the American Kennel Club.

See also
 Dogs portal
 List of dog breeds

References

External links

Terriers
Dog breeds originating in England